Henry M. Eichner (1909–1971) was an American medical artist, illustrator and writer.  He did covers and illustrations for the Los Angeles Science Fantasy Society's magazine Shangri L'Affaires.  His nonfiction book on Atlantis, Atlantean Chronicles, was published by Fantasy Publishing Company, Inc. in 1971.

References

1909 births
1971 deaths
American illustrators
Medical illustrators
Artists from Cleveland
20th-century American non-fiction writers